The 1924–25 Scottish Cup was the 47th staging of Scotland's most prestigious football knockout competition. The Cup was won by Celtic, who defeated Dundee in the final.

First round
Non League teams are in italics.

First Round Replays

First Round 2nd Replay

Second round

Second Round Replays

Second Round 2nd Replay

Third round

Third round replay

Quarter-finals

Quarter-final 1st Replay

Quarter-final 2nd Replay

Semi-finals

Replays

Final

Teams

See also
1924–25 in Scottish football

References

Scottish Cup seasons
1924–25 domestic association football cups
Cup